North Star is a 1974 British thriller novel by Hammond Innes. A man tries to prevent a plot to blow up a North Sea oil rig.

References

Bibliography
 James Vinson & D. L. Kirkpatrick. Contemporary Novelists. St. James Press, 1986.

1974 British novels
Novels by Hammond Innes
British thriller novels
William Collins, Sons books